During the Second World War, the Balard shooting range (stand de tir de Balard) was the site of Nazi torture and executions. It disappeared with the construction of the Boulevard périphérique de Paris.

Location
It was situated on the training area at Issy-les-Moulineaux (now situated with Paris in the 15e arrondissement). The Air Ministry now occupies the site, and it also forms part of the parc Suzanne Lenglen situated on the old héliport de Paris, opened in 1957. It was here that the first French attempts at powered flight occurred in 1905, which in 1911 accidentally killed Maurice Berteaux, minister for war.

History
200m and 50m firing ranges were created here in 1938 for police training, and taken over by the German Geheime Feld Polizei (GFP) after the defeat of France in the 1940 Battle of France.

Victims
The first massacre occurred on 6 July 1942, with the Kommando für Kapital Verbrechen charged with "managing" the firing range, on the orders of Karl Oberg, chief of SS and police.  143 people were tortured then shot here, including :
The five lycéens of the lycée Buffon,
Robert Beck's network
French members of the Francs-Tireurs et Partisans
Members of the colonial FTP-MOI 
Some Gaullists
Unidentified  arrested under the Nacht und Nebel decree 

A plaque commemorating the names of the 143 people executed here was unveiled on 23 April 1961 on the wall of the air ministry (BA 117) on the range's exact site.

Filmography
 The stand de tir de Balard appears in some scenes of Jean-Pierre Melville's film Army of Shadows, 'played' by the firing range at the Satory military camp.

External links
 Document edited on the Ville de Paris site, by Adam Rayski
 The "Nacht und Nebel" decree (in French)

Vichy France
French Resistance